Juneau is a surname. Notable people with the surname include:

Carmen Juneau (1934–1999), Canadian politician
Carol Juneau (born 1945), American politician
Curry Juneau (born 1934), Canadian football player and coach
Denis Juneau (1925–2014), Canadian painter
Denise Juneau (born 1967), American attorney, educator, and politician
Jean-Pierre Juneau (born 1945), Canadian diplomat
Joé Juneau (born 1968), Canadian ice hockey player, Olympic medalist, and engineer
Joe Juneau (prospector) (1836–1899), Canadian miner and prospector; founder of Juneau, Alaska
Madeleine Juneau (1945–2020), Canadian museologist, teacher, nun
Michael J. Juneau (born 1962), American judge and lawyer
Michel Juneau-Katsuya (born ?), Canadian intelligence officer, criminal investigator, and author
Pierre Juneau (1922–2012), Canadian film and broadcast executive and civil servant; Juno Award namesake
Solomon Juneau (1793–1856), Canadian fur trader, land speculator, and politician; a founder of Milwaukee, Wisconsin
William Juneau (1879–1949), American football player and college sports coach

French-language surnames